Meshir 12 - Coptic Calendar - Meshir 14 

The thirteenth day of the Coptic month of Meshir, the sixth month of the Coptic year. In common years, this day corresponds to February 7, of the Julian Calendar, and February 20, of the Gregorian Calendar. This day falls in the Coptic Season of Shemu, the season of the Harvest.

Commemorations

Martyrs

Saints 

 The departure of Pope Timothy III, the 32nd Patriarch of the See of Saint Mark

References 

Days of the Coptic calendar